Marcelo Calero Faria Garcia (born 7 July 1982) is a Brazilian diplomat and politician. He was Minister of Culture of the government Michel Temer.

In 2018, Calero was elected as a deputy with the Cidadania Party with endorsement from the classically liberal Livres movement. He is openly gay and is the second LGBT person to be elected as a Member of Congress.

References

|-

|-

1982 births
Brazilian diplomats
Gay politicians
Government ministers of Brazil
Brazilian LGBT politicians
Living people
Cidadania politicians
Brazilian Democratic Movement politicians
Brazilian Social Democracy Party politicians
Members of the Chamber of Deputies (Brazil) from Rio de Janeiro (state)
LGBT legislators